Netball is one of ten core sports at the 2014 Commonwealth Games in Glasgow. It was netball's fifth appearance at the Commonwealth Games since its inclusion in 1998.

The competition took place between Thursday 24 July and Sunday 3 August; with preliminary and classification matches hosted at the SECC and the medal matches in the neighbouring Hydro Arena. Netball was one of only two women-only events in the 2014 competition schedule, the other being rhythmic gymnastics.

Participating nations

Twelve nations competed in netball at the 2014 Commonwealth Games:
 Scotland was included as the host nation for the Games;
 The top six teams from the IFNA World Rankings automatically qualified;
 The five remaining teams were selected through regional qualifying tournaments.

Umpires

Preliminary round

Pool A

Pool B

Classification matches

Eleventh place match

Ninth place match

Seventh place match

Fifth place match

Medal round

Semi-finals

Bronze medal match

Gold medal match

Final standings

Medallists

References

External links
 Official website: XX Commonwealth Games – Netball
 Commonwealth Games netball medal winners
 Official results book – Netball

 
2014
netball
2014 in netball
International netball competitions hosted by Scotland
netball